Thomas Pickering may refer to:

Thomas Pickering (martyr) (c. 1621–1679), English religious leader
Thomas R. Pickering (born 1931), American diplomat—UN Ambassador
Thomas G. Pickering (1940–2009), professor of medicine at Columbia University Medical Center
Tom Pickering (footballer) (1906-unknown), English footballer

See also 

Timothy Pickering (1745–1829), American diplomat—Secretary of State